Look Who It Is! is the autobiography of British comedian and television presenter Alan Carr.  It details his life from growing up in Weymouth to presenting The Friday Night Project. In the book, Carr recounts how he grew up in the shadow of his father, Graham Carr, and was therefore expected to grow up to be a great football player, despite his childhood "puppy fat". The book laments on his schooldays - he was picked last for the football team when the other students found out his lack of talent and his father forcing him to refuse to communicate with a friend because he was apparently "gaying him up". Carr also tells the story of how puberty left him with "big teeth" and a camp voice. 

"Puberty had been unkind. Whereas it had come in the night and left the other boys with chiselled, stubbly chins and deep masculine voices, I'd been left with a huge pair of knockers and the voice of a pensioner."

Show business memoirs
British autobiographies